Tadashi Ehara is a game designer who has worked primarily on role-playing games.

Career
Tadashi Ehara, the buyer for the San Francisco game store Gambit, became the second employee of Chaosium. Different Worlds magazine was launched in 1979 by Ehara and Greg Stafford of Chaosium as a general-interest role-playing magazine. Ehara became the first editor of Different Worlds, and remained editor-in-chief throughout the magazine's run. Ehara left Chaosium in 1985 and took Different Worlds with him, due to financial difficulties the company was having, and publishing resumed with Different Worlds #39 (May/June 1985) through Ehara's new partner, Sleuth Publications; only eight issues were published by Sleuth over a two-year period, ending with Different Worlds #46 (May/June 1987). Much of the Judges Guild inventory was sold to Ehara.  Gamelords was sold to Ehara in 1986, and he received 10,000 pounds of backstock in 344 cartons on December 1, 1986. Ehara's last big acquisition while at Sleuth was a license to publish the original Empire of the Petal Throne game. Ehara withdrew from Sleuth, taking with him all the RPG products and properties he had acquired over the previous two years. Ehara then used Different Worlds as the basis of a new company, Different Worlds Publications, although he only put out one more issue of Different Worlds, #47 (Fall 1987). From 1987-1989, Ehara also published a reprint of Empire of the Petal Throne (1987), and a reprint of part of Gamescience's Swords & Glory (1987-1988), the second Tékumel RPG.

References

External links
 Tadashi Ehara :: Pen & Paper RPG Database archive

Living people
Role-playing game designers
Year of birth missing (living people)